Love Is Blind is a dating reality television series created by Chris Coelen and produced by Kinetic Content that premiered on Netflix on February 13, 2020, as part of a three-week event.  The show follows a social experiment where single men and women look for love and get engaged, all before meeting in person. 

Netflix renewed Love Is Blind for a fourth and fifth season on March 24, 2022.  The fourth season Love is Blind  is set to be premiered on March 24, 2023.

Format 
The series follows fifteen men and fifteen women, all from the same metropolitan area, hoping to find love. For 10 days, the men and women date each other in purpose-built "pods" where they can talk to each other through a speaker but not see each other. They are initially paired in a speed-dating format, but later can choose to have longer dates.  The daters may extend a marriage proposal whenever they feel ready. A couple meets face to face only after a marriage proposal is accepted.  The engaged couples then head to a couples' retreat at a resort. During this trip, they spend time getting to know their partners and have their first opportunity to be physically intimate.  They also meet the other couples participating in the experiment. 

Following the couples' retreat, the engaged couples move to the same apartment complex in the city where they live. While at the apartments, they meet their partners' friends and families and learn more about their partners' lives, exploring issues such as finances, recreation, personal habits, and their ultimate primary residence. They also plan weddings to be held at the end of four weeks. During this wedding planning period the group of women go wedding dress shopping and the men go suit shopping together, bringing a few friends and/or family members along. They also make choices such as the design and flavor of their wedding cake. At the altar, each participant decides whether or not to say "I do."

Reception

Viewership
As reported in the Netflix 2020 viewing trends summary, Love Is Blind Season One “stayed in the US Top 10 for 47 days straight after its release in February - the second-longest run of any title (in 2020) behind Cocomelon at 64 days. But unlike pre-schoolers, adults don’t tend to watch the same shows over and over again!” 

In 2022, Love Is Blind spent 86 days in the Netflix US Top Ten, more than any series other than Cocomelon, Stranger Things and Ozark.

Love Is Blind was the only unscripted program to rank in Nielsen’s list of 2022’s Top Ten Original Streaming Programs, measuring the most popular programs in America across the year, with 13.1 Billion minutes viewed.

During Season One, Love Is Blind became Netflix's number-one trending program, coinciding with the COVID-19 pandemic. Nielsen reported that Love Is Blind had delivered 1.5 million viewers for the first five episodes, 1.3 million for the next four episodes, and 829,000 for the finale episode in its first full week. At their Q1 meeting in April 2020, Netflix reported 30 million households had watched the series.

On March 24, 2020, Love Is Blind was renewed for a second and third season.

Critical response
The review aggregator Rotten Tomatoes reports an approval rating of 74% based on 23 reviews, with an average rating of 5.75/10. The website's critical consensus reads: "Addictive, but problematic, Love Is Blind is undoubtedly an intoxicating binge, but its version of romance often comes off more toxic than aspirational." Metacritic, which uses a weighted average, assigned a score of 62 out of 100 based on nine critics, indicating "generally favorable reviews".

Daniel D'Addario of Variety writes that "Love is Blind, the smash dating series" is, along with The Ultimatum, "the new standard-bearers for romantic reality TV." D'Addario says that creator Chris Coelen's shows "escalate from relatively simple set-ups to wild heights of human behavior, all because contestants are (or appear to be) left to their own devices."

Brett White of Decider states Love is Blind is a "fascinating relationship study, with all the drama you love." White says "Season 1 was a reality show car crash, the likes of which we’d never seen before. Season 2 didn’t have the newness working for it, so it went full-on bananas and gave us maybe the most chaotic reality TV season on Netflix. Now we’re at Season 3 and…Love Is Blind may have become a well-crafted reality show — nay, a docuseries — about the incredibly complex, at times confusing, sometimes dangerous world of love."

Lucy Mangan of The Guardian writes that Love is Blind "is, basically, crack. Or meth. It’s crack-meth. You will decide to give it five minutes before bed one night and find yourself still on the sofa as the sun rises on another day. You will be bleary-eyed and shattered from all the shouting you have done, the emotional investment you have made, the WhatsApp messages you have typed to a specially formed group and the heartfelt contributions you have made to various internet forums on the subject. It’s that good, is what I am saying."

Yohana Delta of Vanity Fair calls Love is Blind "an emotional thrill ride from start to finish."

Writing in Skeptical Inquirer Craig Foster and Minjung Park raised concerns about the way in which the program poses hypotheses and then conducts experiments with small sample sizes of participants who are not assigned to either an experimental or a control group. This does not allow a  genuine examination of the independent variable and poses a problem if social scientists want to test the suppositions because they would be constrained by ethical considerations if they attempted to recreate anything like the show. The article concluded that while the show can be enjoyed as reality television that dramatises relationships, it is "important to recognize that real science involves a careful and ethical process conducted by experts who scrutinize each other’s work."

The series has been compared to Married at First Sight, also produced by Kinetic Content, and The Bachelor.

Impact on popular culture
Andy Dehnart of reality blurred stated Love is Blind "is one of the biggest reality shows, in terms of cultural conversation, in years."

Alexander Kacala at Today called Love is Blind the "bingeworthy obsession that has taken America by storm."

Georgia Aspinall of Grazia writes "the internet is obsessed with Love is Blind."

Season summary

Season 1 
The first season was launched as a three-week event, followed by a reunion special on Netflix and YouTube on March 5, 2020.

Season 2

Season 3

Participants 
Notes

Episodes

Season 1 (2020–21)
On January 30, 2020, it was announced that Love Is Blind would be released across three weeks. The first five episodes were released on February 13, with four episodes the following week. The finale was released on February 27, 2020. A reunion episode was released on March 5 on Netflix and YouTube. A 3-part companion piece entitled "After The Altar" was released on July 28, 2021.

Season 2 (2022)

Season 3 (2022-23)

Production

Filming 
Filming took place in Atlanta, Georgia, from October 9, 2018, and lasted 38 days up until the weddings. The couples met face-to-face on October 19. The ten days in the pods were shot at Pinewood Atlanta Studios in Fayetteville. Then, after the newly engaged couples left the pods, filming took place at the Grand Velas Riviera Maya in Playa del Carmen, Mexico, when all the couples went on a retreat. The relationships that made it through the retreat in Mexico move in together in an apartment complex. After the retreat, the couples headed back to Atlanta to the Spectrum on Spring apartment building, where they spent the rest of the time filming up until the weddings. The weddings took place at two event spaces called Flourish Atlanta and The Estate on November 15.

For the show's second series, the pods were shipped from Georgia to be filmed in a newly built studio in Santa Clarita, California.

Release 
The trailer for Love Is Blind was released on January 30, 2020. With the trailer, it was announced that the ten-episode series would be released on a three-week schedule: the first five episodes were released on February 13, 2020, the next four on February 20, and the finale on February 27.

On February 26, 2020, Netflix announced a reunion special available on YouTube on March 5.

Unaired engagements 
A total of eight couples got engaged among the participants. In addition to the six couples shown on the series, couples Westley Baer and Lexie Skipper and Rory Newbrough and Danielle Drouin also got engaged in the show. Newbrough told People, "As we were preparing to go to the Mexico trip, the leads of the show came in and said, 'Hey, we were expecting maybe one or two [engagements]. The shows we've done before, we've never had this much success. We prepared for five. Then we got eight engagements, so we had to pick who we were going to follow.' We got our phones back. They thanked us graciously and said, 'Sorry, we just don’t have enough to cover everybody.'"

After getting engaged in the pods, Baer and Skipper continued to date for three months before breaking up. Newbrough and Drouin took a week-long trip to Miami together after getting engaged. They broke up after returning from the trip and Drouin decided to pursue a relationship with another participant on the show, Matt Thomas. Thomas and Drouin later split as well.

Controversy 
In July 2022, Jeremy Hartwell, a contestant on the second season, filed a lawsuit over what he claims were “inhumane working conditions.”

Accolades

International versions
A Brazilian adaptation premiered on October 6, 2021, as part of a three-week event. A Japanese adaptation premiered on February 8, 2022.

References

External links 
 
 

2020 American television series debuts
2020s American reality television series
American dating and relationship reality television series
English-language Netflix original programming
Television series about marriage
Television shows filmed in Atlanta
Television shows filmed in Mexico
Television shows filmed at Pinewood Atlanta Studios
Television shows set in Atlanta
Television shows set in Mexico
Wedding television shows
Dating and relationship reality television series